Yip Tsz-fung (born 19 September 1993 in Hong Kong) is a professional squash player who represents Hong Kong. He reached a career-high world ranking of World No. 21 in April 2019.

References

External links 
 
 
 

1993 births
Living people
Hong Kong male squash players
Asian Games medalists in squash
Asian Games silver medalists for Hong Kong
Asian Games bronze medalists for Hong Kong
Squash players at the 2014 Asian Games
Squash players at the 2018 Asian Games
Medalists at the 2014 Asian Games
Medalists at the 2018 Asian Games
Competitors at the 2017 World Games